Francisco Primo de Verdad National Airport (sometimes abbreviated as Francisco P.V. y R. Airport)  is a domestic airport serving Lagos de Moreno, in the Jalisco province of Mexico. The airport is named after Francisco Primo de Verdad y Ramos, a lawyer and politician.

History 
The airport was built under the name "Francisco Primo de Verdad National Airport" during the six-year presidency of Carlos Salinas de Gortari. From 1994 until 2000, it had commercial flights operated by TAESA, Mexico's third-largest airline at the time. There were regular flights to Mexico City, Tijuana, and at times also to Guadalajara and Zacatecas. In 2012, there were plans to establish Lagos de Moreno as a cargo airport by Mexican investors.

Since the closure of the national airport the facility is now being used as a privately held aerodrome by general aviation enthusiasts.

See also 

List of the busiest airports in Mexico

References 

Airports in Jalisco